Johan Ernst Saari (20 July 1882 - 29 March 1918; original surname Ylisaari) was a Finnish farmer and politician, born in Lapua. He was a member of the Parliament of Finland from 1913 until his death in 1918, representing the Finnish Party. During the Finnish Civil War, being a prominent supporter of the White side, he was arrested by Red Guards and shot in Tampere on 29 March 1918, as White troops were preparing to storm the city.

References

1882 births
1918 deaths
People from Lapua
People from Vaasa Province (Grand Duchy of Finland)
Finnish Party politicians
Members of the Parliament of Finland (1913–16)
Members of the Parliament of Finland (1916–17)
Members of the Parliament of Finland (1917–19)
People of the Finnish Civil War (White side)
Deaths by firearm in Finland